Hope Academy is a coeducational secondary school with academy status located in Newton-le-Willows in the English county of Merseyside.

History
St Aelred's Catholic Technology College was a school specialising in Technology located on Birley Street with around 1,300 pupils in 2020.

Newton-le-Willows Community High School was a community school administered by St Helens Metropolitan Borough Council with around 900 pupils.

The two schools merged in September 2011 as Hope Academy, now a joint-faith school sponsored by Liverpool Hope University, the Anglican Diocese of Liverpool and the Roman Catholic Archdiocese of Liverpool.

The Academy is built on the site of the playing fields on Newton-Le-Willows Community High School, with the existing school later demolished once the Academy opened, and the new Academy's playing field constructed on the site of the old school. The St Aelred's site has since been bought by a  developer and around 200 dwellings has erected on half of the land, with the other portion being used as a football field.

Curriculum
Hope Academy offers GCSEs and BTECs as programmes of study for pupils. Students in the sixth form have the option to study from a range of A-levels and further BTECs.

References

External links
Hope Academy official website

Secondary schools in St Helens, Merseyside
Academies in St Helens, Merseyside
Liverpool Hope University
Church of England secondary schools in the Diocese of Liverpool
Catholic secondary schools in the Archdiocese of Liverpool
Newton-le-Willows
2011 establishments in England